The Meiringen–Innertkirchen railway line is a  railway line in the Swiss canton of Bern.

The Kraftwerke Oberhasli (KWO) electricity supply company built the line in 1926 to support the development of the local hydroelectricity industry. It began carrying passengers in 1946 and the KWO spun off a new company, the Meiringen-Innertkirchen-Bahn (MIB), to operate it. KWO sold the company to the Zentralbahn at the end of 2020. The line serves a local transport role, as well as transporting tourists to the scenic Aare Gorge.

History
The line was originally built as a construction railway to support the building of hydroelectric dams in the Oberhasli and the Grimsel Pass. It was built by the Kraftwerke Oberhasli (KWO) company, which was founded to build and operate the hydroelectric plants, and it was opened in 1926. Several Mallet-type steam locomotives were acquired from the Rhätische Bahn to operate the line. As well as construction traffic, the line also operated a limited passenger service for workers and their families. In 1931 a battery railcar was purchased, and a second in 1939.

In 1940, a military installation was constructed in caverns, which connected to the Kirchetunnel that by-passes the Aare Gorge, as well as to the gorge itself. A train parked in the tunnel provided offices and other facilities for this installation. The caverns and connecting tunnels still exist, but are no longer used.

In 1946 the line received a licence to operate as a public passenger-carrying railway, and to this end the Meiringen-Innertkirchen-Bahn company was founded to operate the line as a subsidiary of the owners, KWO.

When the license came up for renewal in 1976, it was decided to upgrade the line drastically. The heavy, four-wheel battery railcars were harsh on the track and trackbed, and were at the end of their economic life. The line was electrified and electric streetcar-type railcars were purchased. In 1996, a new railcar was purchased to run most services. In 2005, a second-hand railcar was purchased to act as reserve, allowing the former streetcars to be scrapped.

In 2003, the underground Aareschlucht Ost stop was opened, to provide access to the eastern entrance to the Aare Gorge.

On January 1, 2021 the Zentralbahn took over the line.

Operation

Route
The line begins at track 13 of Meiringen railway station, where it is physically connected to the Brünig line of the Zentralbahn company. Both lines are of  gauge, but are incompatible electrically, and no through passenger services are operated. Shortly after leaving the station, the line crosses a level crossing and passes the disused former passenger terminus of the line, used until passenger service was extended into the main station.

The first stop on the line is at Alpbach. This is some  walk from the lower station of the Reichenbachfall Funicular, which takes visitors up to the famous Reichenbach Falls, the site of the apparent death of Sir Arthur Conan Doyle's fictional hero, Sherlock Holmes. For many years, Alpbach was the point at with the MIB made a level crossing with the Meiringen–Reichenbach–Aareschlucht line, a tramway that existed from 1912 to 1956.

From Alpbach the line follows the north bank of the Aare river. The next stop is Aareschlucht West, just before the beginning of the scenic Aare Gorge or Aareschlucht. Both Aareschlucht stops link to the tourist walkways through the gorge itself.

After a further intermediate stop at Unterwasser, the line passes through the middle of Innertkirchen village, calling at the Innertkirchen Post stop, before ending at the KWO plant in Innertkirchen. Beyond the passenger terminus, the line continues into the KWO's workshops, where the line's workshops are also found.

Services
Passenger services are operated once or twice per hour, seven days a week, with connections into and out of most trains on the Brunig line. Trains comprise a single railcar.

The operation of the Aareschlucht Ost stop is particularly notable, as the train stops within the tunnel, with its front door adjacent to a door in the side of the tunnel that opens out through the side of the gorge. The tunnel door is opened by the train driver only once the train has come to a halt. The stop is a request stop, and passengers wishing to board a train must press a button outside the tunnel door to request the train to stop.

Freight traffic is run as demand warrants, largely carrying spare parts arriving via the Brünigbahn for the power stations.

Rolling stock

Current rolling stock

Former rolling stock

References

External links
 
 Official web pages of the Meiringen-Innertkirchen-Bahn
 Video showing the reserve railcar 11 operating on the line
 Video showing driver's eye view of line from Innertkirchen to Meiringen

Metre gauge railways in Switzerland
Oberhasli
Railway lines in Switzerland
Transport in the canton of Bern
1200 V DC railway electrification